Michelle "Shelley" Andrews OAM (born 19 November 1971 in Newcastle, New South Wales) is a former field hockey midfielder from Australia, who was a member of the Australia women's national field hockey team, known as the Hockeyroos, that won the gold medal at the 1996 Summer Olympics in Atlanta, Georgia. She now uses her married name of Mitchell and is a coach at Teddington Hockey Club, Greater London.

On 26 January 1997, Andrews was awarded the Order of Australia in "recognition of service to sport as a gold medallist at the Atlanta Olympic Games 1996". On 22 June 2000, Andrews was awarded the Australian Sports Medal for hockey achievements.

References

External links
 
 Australian Olympic Committee

1971 births
Living people
Australian female field hockey players
Field hockey players at the 1996 Summer Olympics
Olympic field hockey players of Australia
Olympic gold medalists for Australia
Commonwealth Games gold medallists for Australia
People from New South Wales
Olympic medalists in field hockey
Recipients of the Medal of the Order of Australia
Recipients of the Australian Sports Medal
Medalists at the 1996 Summer Olympics
Commonwealth Games medallists in field hockey
Field hockey players at the 1998 Commonwealth Games
20th-century Australian women
Medallists at the 1998 Commonwealth Games